Schack may refer to:

People
 Adolf Friedrich von Schack (1815–1894), a German poet and historian of literature
 Adolph Wilhelm Schack von Staffeldt (1769–1826), a Danish poet
 Anna Sophie Schack, née Rantzau (1689–1760), a Danish noblewoman, landowner and builder.
 Benedikt Schack (1758–1826), a Bohemian composer and tenor
 Bo Schack (born 1955), a Danish lawyer
 Friedrich-August Schack (1892–1968), a German general of World War II
 Gertrude Guillaume-Schack, born Gertrud Gräfin Schack von Wittenau (1845–1903), a German women's rights activist
 Günther Schack (1917–2003), a World War II German aviator
 Hans Schack (1608–1676), a Danish privy councillor and field marshal
 Otto Wilhelm Christian Schack (1818–1875), Danish born American financier 
 Roberta Arline Schack (born 1929), an American actress better known as Roberta Haynes
 Sophus Schack (1811–1864), Danish painter and soldier 
 Torsten Schack Pedersen (born 1976), a Danish politician and MP

Counts of Schackenborg
 Otto Didrik Schack, 1st Count of Schackenborg (1652–1683)
 Hans Schack, 2nd Count of Schackenborg (1676–1719)
 Otto Didrik Schack, 3rd Count of Schackenborg (1710–1741)
 Hans Schack, 4th Count of Schackenborg (1734–1796)

See also
Schackenborg Castle